The 1971–72 NBA season was the 76ers 23rd season in the NBA and 9th season in Philadelphia. The team finished with a record of 30–52 and missed the post season for the 1st time in franchise history, ending an NBA-record streak of 22 consecutive appearances.

The team made a major trade to obtain guards Fred Carter and Kevin Loughery from the Baltimore Bullets in exchange for guard Archie Clark and draft picks. At the start of the season the team was 9–4 after 13 games but imploded before long.

After the season Billy Cunningham left for the ABA, Lucious Jackson retired due to nagging injuries & coach Jack Ramsay left to become the head coach of the Buffalo Braves.

Offseason

Draft picks

This table only displays picks through the second round.

Roster

Regular season

Season standings

z – clinched division title
y – clinched division title
x – clinched playoff spot

Record vs. opponents

Game log

Awards and records
Billy Cunningham, All-NBA Second Team

References

Philadelphia
Philadelphia 76ers seasons
Philadel
Philadel